Ghanem Ibrahim al-Hassan was a Syrian Brigadier General who was shot and killed in Idlib by armed opposition fighters during the Syrian Civil War, in the 2011 Idlib clashes, according to Syrian state media SANA. He had been training soldiers at the Assad Military Engineering Academy in the town of Saraqeb in Idlib. According to SANA, al-Hasan was from Homs.

References

2011 deaths
People from Homs
Syrian military personnel killed in action
Military personnel killed in the Syrian civil war
Deaths by firearm in Syria
Year of birth missing